Joaquín Roca Rey (January 27, 1923, Lima – 2004) was a Peruvian sculptor.  Along with Cristina Gálvez, Jorge Piqueras and Juan Guzmán he has been called one of the most important Peruvian sculptors of the twentieth century.  His work shows the influence of Henry Moore.

References

People from Lima
Peruvian sculptors
1923 births
2004 deaths
20th-century Peruvian male artists
20th-century Peruvian sculptors
Male sculptors